Chris Dorley-Brown is a British documentary photographer and filmmaker, based in the East End of London.

Since 1984, Dorley-Brown has been creating a photographic archive of the London Borough of Hackney. Since 1993 he has collaborated with other people on a variety of projects in radio, print, cinema, television, Internet and architecture.

His photography books include The Longest Way Round (2015), Drivers in the 1980s (2015) and The Corners (2018). His films include BBC in the East End 1958–1973 (2007) and 15 Seconds Part 3 (2015).

Life and work
Dorley-Brown grew up on the south coast of England. He trained as a silkscreen printer and print finisher after leaving school. Later he joined the photographer Red Saunders' studio as a camera assistant. He went freelance in 1984, creating a photographic archive of the London Borough of Hackney where he lived and worked, which he has continued to do.

"Largely self-taught, his cultural education was formed in east London in the late seventies, against a backdrop of strongly polarised political conflict and change. His influences are shaped by memory, both personal and those of others."

In 1991, he expanded into filmmaking and other activities associated with burgeoning new technologies. Since 1993 Dorley-Brown has collaborated with other people of various creative disciplines, as well as groups and individuals in the public sphere, on a variety of projects in radio, print, cinema, television, Internet and architecture.

Publications

Publications by Dorley-Brown
The Corners. Self‐published, 2010.
Continuum. FusionLab Inc, 2014. Digital photobook for iPad.
The Longest Way Round. UK: Overlapse, 2015. .
Drivers in the 1980s. East London Photo Stories Book 6. London: Hoxton Mini Press, 2015. .
The Corners. London: Hoxton Mini Press, 2018. .

Publication with others
The Cut. London: Space, 2011. Photographs by Dorley-Brown, Jessie Brennan, and Daniel Lehan. Edited by Dorley-Brown.

Publications edited by Dorley-Brown
The East End in Colour 1960-1980. London: Hoxton Mini Press, 2018. By David Granick. Edited and with an introduction by Dorley-Brown. . Edition of 3000 copies. Second edition; .

Publications with contributions by Dorley-Brown
Scarpe: Moda e Fantasia = Shoes: Fashion and Fantasy. Milan: Rizzoli, 1990. Edited by Colin McDowell and Manolo Blahnik. . With a preface by Blahnik.
Photographers London: 1839-1994. London: Museum of London, 1995. Edited by Mike Seaborne. .
Future Face: Image, Identity, Innovation. London: Profile; Wellcome Trust; Science Museum, 2003. By Sandra Kemp. . With contributions from Vicki Bruce and Alf Linney. Accompanied the Future Face exhibition at the Science Museum, October 2004 – February 2005.
Face: The New Photographic Portrait. London: Thames & Hudson, 2004. By William Ewing. .
Faire faces: Le nouveau portrait photographique. Arles, France: Actes Sud, 2004. .
Photography Reborn: Image Making in the Digital Era. New York City: Abrams, 2006. Edited by Jonathan Lipkin. .
London Street Photography: 1860–2010. London: Museum of London; Stockport: Dewi Lewis, 2011. . Selected from the Museum of London collection by Mike Seaborne and Anna Sparham. Published to accompany an exhibition at the Museum.
The Art of Dissent: Adventures in London's Olympic State. Marshgate, 2012. Edited by Hilary Powell and Isaac Marrero-Guillamon. . Dorley-Brown contributes journal extracts.
The Wick. Issue 3. London: See Studio, 2013. Edited by Marrero-Guillamon. Newspaper with supplement, "Picturing the Wick", by Dorley-Brown and Francesca Weber-Newth.

Films by Dorley-Brown
BBC in the East End 1958–1973 (2007), for BBC / British Film Institute. Edited by Dorley-Brown. 3 hours long set of 2 DVDs and 40 page booklet with an essay by Tony White. Made on a BBC Creative Archive placement at the BBC Creative Archive Licence Group.
15 Seconds Part 3 (2015), for Wellcome Collection.

Collections
Dorley-Brown's work is held in the following public collections:
Museum of London, London.
Richard and Ronay Menschel Library, George Eastman Museum, Rochester, New York: The Longest Way Round book.

References

External links 

Me and my Cortina: drivers in the 1980s – in pictures – gallery of Drivers in the 1980s photos at The Guardian

Year of birth missing (living people)
Place of birth missing (living people)
Living people
Photographers from London
Documentary photographers
20th-century British photographers
21st-century British photographers